The Matsu Airport may be:

Matsu Beigan Airport, Beigan, Matsu Islands, Taiwan
Matsu Nangan Airport, Nangan, Matsu Islands, Taiwan